Mike McLean is an Australian former rugby league footballer who played in the 1980s and 1990s. McLean played in the New South Wales Rugby League and the Brisbane Rugby League  for the Eastern Suburbs Roosters, Newcastle Knights and the Gold Coast Seagulls. He gained selection for the Queensland Origin team.

Playing career
He started his first grade career for the Easts Tigers in the Brisbane Rugby League in 1983.  McLean also ran second in the Dally M medal to Gavin Miller in 1988. He was affectionately known as the 'Paddle pop lion' due to his rather prominent head of hair.

Representative career
McLean was named in the Queensland squad in 1991 to 1992.

Post playing
McLean is a fourth generation  publican and operates a bar in Bowen, Queensland.

References

Australian rugby league players
Queensland Rugby League State of Origin players
Newcastle Knights players
Gold Coast Chargers players
Sydney Roosters players
Living people
1963 births
Rugby league second-rows